Rita Vilaça (born 7 September 1993 in Braga) is a Portuguese former tennis player.

Vilaça won one doubles title on the ITF Circuit in her career. On 3 October 2011, she reached her best singles ranking of world No. 1020. On 24 June 2013, she peaked at No. 741 in the doubles rankings.

Playing for Portugal Fed Cup team, Vilaça has a win–loss record of 0–2.

References

External links
 
 
 

1993 births
Living people
Sportspeople from Braga
Portuguese female tennis players
21st-century Portuguese women